The SNCF Class CC 65500 diesel locomotives were built by CAFL and CEM between 1955 and 1959. They were used on heavy express freight in the Paris area, being commonly seen on the Grande Ceinture lines around Paris.

Preservation
CC 65506 is preserved at Oignies.

65500
Co′Co′ locomotives
CC 65500
Railway locomotives introduced in 1955
Standard gauge locomotives of France

Freight locomotives
Co'Co' Diesel Locomotives of Europe